The following is a list of notable deaths in June 2012.

Entries for each day are listed alphabetically by surname.  A typical entry lists information in the following sequence:
Name, age, country of citizenship and reason for notability, established cause of death, reference (and language of reference, if not English).

June 2012

1
Faruq Z. Bey, 70, American jazz saxophonist, emphysema.
Pádraig Faulkner, 94, Irish politician, TD for Louth (1957–1987), Minister for Defence (1979–1980), Ceann Comhairle (1980–1981).
Milan Gaľa, 59, Slovak politician.
Avram Goldstein, 92, American pharmacologist.
Marcial Gómez Parejo, 81, Spanish  Andalusian painter and illustrator.
Nick Knilans, 94, American bomber pilot.
Marion Sandler, 81, American businesswoman (Golden West Financial).
Jörg Schmeisser, 70, German-Australian printmaker.
Brahmeshwar Singh, 67, Indian militia chief, head of Ranvir Sena, shooting.
Juozas Tunaitis, 83, Lithuanian Roman Catholic prelate, Auxiliary Bishop of Vilnius (1991–2010).

2
Eliseo Nicolás Alonso, 57, Spanish woodcarver.
Avraham Botzer, 83, Israeli general, Commander of the Navy (1968–1972).
Adolfo Calero, 80, Nicaraguan businessman, leader of the Democratic Force, pneumonia and kidney failure.
Richard Dawson, 79, English-born American actor (Hogan's Heroes) and host (Family Feud), esophageal cancer.
L. K. Doraiswamy, 85, Indian chemical engineer, author and academic, heart ailments.
LeRoy Ellis, 72, American basketball player (Los Angeles Lakers, Philadelphia 76ers, Baltimore Bullets), prostate cancer.
Héctor García Cobo, 88, Mexican photo-journalist.
 David C. Garrett, Jr., 90, American businessman, CEO of Delta Air Lines.
*Jan Gmelich Meijling, 76, Dutch politician, Mayor of Castricum (1978–1985) and Den Helder (1985–1994), State Secretary for Defence (1994–1998).
Kathryn Joosten, 72, American actress (Desperate Housewives, The West Wing, Wedding Crashers), lung cancer.
Frazier Mohawk, 71, American record producer (Buffalo Springfield, The Byrds).
Soini Nikkinen, 88, Finnish Olympic javelin thrower and world record holder.
Marco Onorato, 59, Italian cinematographer.
Oliver,  55, Congolese-born common chimpanzee noted for his upright stature and humanlike traits.
Genichi Taguchi, 88, Japanese engineer and statistician.

3
Carol Ann Abrams, 69, American film producer (The Ernest Green Story) and author, mother of J. J. Abrams, cancer.
Levi Chibuike Ajuonuma, 60, Nigerian academic, journalist and public relations expert, aircrash.
Bob Bill, 72, American football player and businessman, heart failure.
Peter Orlebar Bishop, 94, Australian neurophysiologist.
Ibrahim Damcida, 78–79, Nigerian administrator, plane crash.
Angelo Di Castro, 86, Italian sculptor.
James L. Foreman, 85, American judge.
Rosa Guy, 89, Trinidadian-born American author, cancer.
Andy Hamilton, 94, Jamaican-born British saxophonist and composer.
Rajsoomer Lallah, 79, Mauritian lawyer and judge.
Alphonse Le Gastelois, 97, British recluse.
John Lang, 84, British Anglican priest and broadcaster, Dean of Lichfield (1980–1993).
Mary Perry, 69, American Olympic volleyball player, neurodegenerative disease.
Hugh Poole, 86, New Zealand Olympic sailor.
Jean-Louis Richard, 85, French film director.
Roy Salvadori, 90, British Formula One race car driver.
Sir Brian Talboys, 90, New Zealand politician, MP for Wallace (1957–1981), Deputy Prime Minister (1975–1981).
Sergio Tedesco, 84, Italian actor, voice actor and tenor.
Roel de Wit, 85, Dutch politician, Mayor of Alkmaar (1970–1976), Queen's Commissioner of North Holland (1976–1992).

4
Peter Beaven, 86, New Zealand architect, cancer.
J. C. Bhattacharyya, 81, Indian astronomer.
Bobby Black, 85, Scottish football player.
Pedro Borbón, 65, Dominican Republic-born American baseball player (Cincinnati Reds), cancer.
Dennis Eugene Breedlove, 72, American botanist, herbarium curator, and plant collector.
Tom Cryer, 62, American lawyer.
Jim Fitzgerald, 86, American businessman, majority owner of the Milwaukee Bucks (1976–1985) and Golden State Warriors (1986–1995).
Ireneo García Alonso, 89, Spanish Roman Catholic prelate, Bishop of Albacete (1968–1980).
Barney Gibbens, 77, British businessman.
Per-Ulf Helander, 76, Swedish Olympic luger.
Bernard Jean, 87, Canadian lawyer and politician, member (1960–1970) and Speaker (1963–1966) of the Legislative Assembly of New Brunswick.
Stan Jolley, 86, American art director and production designer (Witness, Superman, Caddyshack).
Eduard Khil, 77, Russian singer ("Trololo"), stroke.
* Abu Yahya al-Libi, 49, Libyan terrorist, senior member of al-Qaeda, drone strike.
Lim Hock Siew, 81, Singaporean doctor, politician, and political prisoner.
* Rodolfo Quezada Toruño, 80, Guatemalan Roman Catholic prelate, Cardinal Archbishop of Guatemala (2001–2010), intestinal blockage.               
Herb Reed, 83, American singer (The Platters).
Philip Snow, 96, British cricketer and administrator.
Per Sunderland, 87, Norwegian actor.
Barry Unsworth, 81, British novelist, lung cancer.

5
Carl Bledsoe, 88, American politician, Colorado State Representative (1973–1991).
Ray Bradbury, 91, American science fiction and fantasy author (Fahrenheit 451, Something Wicked This Way Comes).
Steve Buttle, 59, English football player and coach, cancer.
Keith Coster, 92, South African army officer.
Richard Duc, 77, French rower.
Guy Elmour, New Caledonian football manager.
Shapoor Gharib, 78–79, Iranian director and screenplay writer.
John Hinrichs, 78, American welding engineer, idiopathic pulmonary fibrosis.
David Hodgson, 73, Australian judge.
Caroline John, 71,  British actress (Doctor Who, Love Actually).
Hal Keller, 83, American baseball player (Washington Senators) and executive (Seattle Mariners, Texas Rangers), esophageal cancer.
* Lucky Diamond,  15, American Maltese dog, Guinness World Record holder (dog most photographed with celebrities), cancer.
Mihai Pătrașcu, 29, Romanian computer scientist, brain cancer.
Athinodoros Prousalis, 86, Greek film and television actor, heart attack.
Charlie Sutton, 88, Australian football player and coach (Footscray).
Chris Thompson, 52, English footballer.

6
Anna Ali, 45, Kenyan religious sister.
Frank Barsotti, 74, American photographer.
Mohamed Elrawi, 77, Egyptian academic.
Lillian Gallo, 84, American television producer.
Jiang Minkuan, 82, Chinese politician, Governor of Sichuan.
Vladimir Krutov, 52, Russian ice hockey player (CSKA Moscow, Vancouver Canucks) and Olympic medal-winner (1980, 1984, 1988), internal bleeding and liver failure.
Li Wangyang, 62, Chinese labour rights activist, hanging.
Jean-Louis Loday, 66, French mathematician.
Nolan Miller, 79, American fashion designer, lung cancer.
* Manuel Preciado Rebolledo, 54, Spanish football player and coach (Sporting Gijón, Racing Santander), heart attack.
Agostinho José Sartori, 83, Brazilian Roman Catholic prelate, Bishop of Palmas–Francisco Beltrão (1970–2005), complications of Parkinson's and Alzheimer's diseases.
*Prince Tomohito of Mikasa, 66, Japanese royal, cancer.
Mykola Volosyanko, 40, Ukrainian football player, heart failure.

7
Walter Becker, 79, German racing cyclist.
F. Herbert Bormann, 90, American ecologist, discovered acid rain.
William Cartwright, 89, Bahamian politician and publisher, co-founder of the Progressive Liberal Party.
John T. Cunningham, 96, American historian, journalist, and writer.
Richard N. Dixon, 74, American politician.
David Gibson, 76, English cricketer.
Peter Gray, 85, British chemist.
Ping-ti Ho, 95, Chinese-born American historian.
Mervin Jackson, 65, American basketball player (Utah Stars).
Lil Phat, 19, American rap artist ("Independent"), shooting.
Abid Hamid Mahmud, 55, Iraqi military officer, bodyguard and personal secretary of Saddam Hussein, execution by hanging.
John Medlin, 78, American banker, CEO of Wachovia (1977–1993), heart attack.
Cotton Owens, 88, American Hall of Fame NASCAR driver and owner, lung cancer.
J. Michael Riva, 63, American production designer (The Color Purple, A Few Good Men, Iron Man), stroke.
Rupert Scotland, 74, Bermudian cricketer, long illness.
Chuck Share, 85, American basketball player (Fort Wayne Pistons, St. Louis Hawks, Minneapolis Lakers).
Phillip V. Tobias, 86, South African palaeoanthropologist.
Robert L. Washington III, 47, American comic book writer, co-creator of Static.
Bob Welch, 66, American musician (Fleetwood Mac, Paris) and songwriter ("Sentimental Lady"), suicide by gunshot.

8
Luis Aloy, 82, Spanish football player (FC Barcelona, Real Oviedo).
*Baku Akae, 79, Japanese novelist.
Marie-Thérèse Bardet, 114, French supercentenarian.
Pete Brennan, 75, American basketball player (New York Knicks), prostate cancer.
Frank Cady, 96, American actor (Green Acres, The Adventures of Ozzie and Harriet, Petticoat Junction).
K. S. R. Das, 76, Indian film director.
Wilf Doyle, 87, Canadian musician.
Jane Evans, 65, New Zealand artist.
Bengt Fröbom, 85, Swedish Olympic cyclist.
Robert Galley, 91, French politician, Mayor of Troyes (1972–1995), Minister of Transport (1972–1973), Compagnon de la Libération.
Nikolay Ivanov, 62, Russian Olympic gold medal-winning (1976) rower.
Tom Kamara, ~63, Liberian journalist.
Ivan Lessa, 77, Brazilian journalist, pulmonary emphysema.
Pat Mahoney, 83, Canadian businessman, politician, and judge, MP for Calgary South (1968–1972), General Manager of the Calgary Stampeders (1965).
Sepp Maier, 77, German Olympic skier.
Charles E. M. Pearce, 72, New Zealand-born Australian mathematician, traffic collision.
Ghassan Tueni, 86, Lebanese journalist and politician, Ambassador to the United Nations (1977–1982).

9
Hans Abramson, 82, Swedish film director.
Audrey Arno, 70, German pop singer, Alzheimer's disease.
Roy Ayres, 82, American guitar player.
Rachel Browne, 77, Canadian dancer and choreographer.
Régis Clère, 55, French Olympic (1980) road bicycle racer, complications during surgery.
Burwyn Davidson, 68, Australian politician.
Don Durbridge, 73, British broadcaster.
George Ede, 72, Canadian biathlete.
Masahisa Fukase, 78, Japanese photographer, cerebral hemorrhage.
Paul Jenkins, 88, American abstract expressionist painter.
Thomas Kalman, 94, American politician.
John Maples, Baron Maples, 69, British politician and life peer, MP for Lewisham West (1983–1992) and Stratford-on-Avon (1997–2010), cancer.
Ivan Minatti, 88, Slovenian poet and translator.
Georges Sari, 87, Greek author and actress.
Hawk Taylor, 73, American baseball player (Milwaukee Braves, New York Mets, Kansas City Royals).
Abram Wilson, 38, American jazz trumpeter, cancer.

10
 Piero Bellugi, 87, Italian conductor.
Eivind Bolle, 88, Norwegian politician.
Kenneth Clark, 89, New Zealand-born British ceramicist.
Nikita Dolgushin, 73, Russian Soviet ballet dancer and choreographer.
Jimmy Elledge, 69, American singer, complications following a stroke.
Judy Freudberg, 62, American television (Sesame Street) and film (The Land Before Time, An American Tail) writer, brain tumor.
Warner Fusselle, 68, American sportscaster (Brooklyn Cyclones, This Week in Baseball), heart attack.
Will Hoebee, 64, Dutch music producer, cancer.
Richard L. Hoffman, 84, American zoologist.
Sixten Isberg, 90, Swedish alpine skier.
Maria Keil, 97, Portuguese artist.
Georges Mathieu, 91, French artist.
Dante Micheli, 73, Italian football player.
Ruby Monaghan, 96, Australian cricketer.
 Joshua Orwa Ojode, 53, Kenyan politician, MP for Ndhiwa (since 1994), Assistant Minister for Internal Security, helicopter crash.
 Elvis J. Perrodin, 55, American jockey, cancer.
 George Saitoti, 66, Kenyan politician, MP for Kajiado North (since 1988), Vice-President (1989–1997, 1999–2002), helicopter crash.
 Sudono Salim, 95, Indonesian businessman.
 Eugene Selznick, 82, American Hall of Fame volleyball player and Olympic (1964, 1996, 2000) coach, pneumonia.
 Gérard Théodore, 91, French Compagnon de la Libération.
Hugo Thiemann, 95, Swiss businessman, co-founded Club of Rome.
Daya-Nand Verma, 78, Indian mathematician (Verma modules). 
 Gordon West, 69, English football player (Everton), cancer.

11
 Lee Allen, 77, American Olympic wrestler (1956, 1960) and coach (1980), heart failure.
Kinsey Anderson, 85, American professor of physics (University of California at Berkeley).
 Hector Bianciotti, 82, Argentine-born French writer, member of the Académie française.
 Dave Boswell, 67, American baseball player (Minnesota Twins), heart attack.
 Samanunu Cakobau-Talakuli, 72, Fijian chief and politician.
Patricia Donahue, 87, American actress.
 Raymond Eid, 81, Syrian Maronite Catholic hierarch, Metropolitan of Damascus (1999–2005).
Michael Fellman, 68–69, Canadian professor.
 Anthony Hancock, 65, British publisher, stroke.
 Masazumi Harada, 77, Japanese doctor, researcher of Minamata disease, acute myeloid leukemia.
 Norman F. Lent, 81, American politician, U.S. Representative from New York (1971–1993), cancer.
A.M. Parkin, 68, English artist.
Reggie Pearman, 89, American middle-distance runner.
Ann Rutherford, 94, Canadian-born American actress (Gone with the Wind, The Secret Life of Walter Mitty), heart disease.
Stay High 149, 61, American graffiti artist, complications of liver disease.
Teófilo Stevenson, 60, Cuban Olympic gold medal-winning (1972, 1976, 1980) boxer, heart attack.
Berthold Wulf, 85, German priest, poet and philosopher.

12
Marwan Arafat, 67, Syrian footballer and referee, assassinated.
Philip H. Corboy, 87, American lawyer.
Darara, 29, Irish-bred French-trained Thoroughbred racehorse, winner of the 1986 Prix de Psyché and Prix Vermeille.
Juan José Díaz Infante Núñez, 75, Mexican architect and industrial designer.
Henry Hill, 69, American mobster, inspiration for the movie Goodfellas, heart disease.
Sheikh Mukhtar Mohamed Hussein, 100, Somali politician, Interim President (1969).
Annie B. Martin, 91, American civil rights activist.
Margarete Mitscherlich-Nielsen, 94, Danish-born German psychoanalyst and feminist.
 Elinor Ostrom, 78, American economist and Nobel laureate (Economics, 2009), pancreatic cancer.
Mercedes Otero, 74, Puerto Rican politician, member of Senate (1993 to 2001), swollen appendix.
 Pahiño, 89, Spanish footballer.
 Aldo Ronconi, 93, Italian racing cyclist.
 Frank Walker, 69, Australian politician, MP for Robertson (1990–1996), and judge, cancer.
 Don Woods, 84, American meteorologist and cartoonist, cancer.

13
Chris Andrews, 55, American entrepreneur.
James Ashworth, 23, English soldier, awarded Victoria Cross, shot. 
Sam Beddingfield, 78, American aerospace engineer, lung cancer.
Graeme Bell, 97, Australian jazz musician and composer, stroke.
Chiara Corbella Petrillo, 28, Italian anti-abortion activist, carcinoma.
Monte Crockett, 73, American football player.
Roger Garaudy, 98, French philosopher, author, and Holocaust denier.
* Luiz Gonzaga Bergonzini, 76, Brazilian Roman Catholic prelate, Bishop of Guarulhos (1991–2011).
Mehdi Hassan, 84, Pakistani ghazal singer, chest infection.
Jože Humer, 76, Slovenian composer, cancer.
Erica Kennedy, 42, American author and columnist.
William Standish Knowles, 95, American chemist and Nobel laureate (Chemistry, 2001), complications from amyotrophic lateral sclerosis.
Dawid Kruiper, 71, South African tribal leader, tuberculosis.
Hannu Posti, 86, Finnish long-distance runner and biathlete.
Giacinto Santambrogio, 67, Italian professional bicycle racer.
Michael Sokolski, 85, Polish-born American design engineer, founder of Scantron, heart failure.
Gladys Widdiss, 97, American tribal historian and potter, President of the Aquinnah Wampanoag of Gay Head (1978–1987).

14
Dick Acres, 78, American basketball coach.
Peter Archer, Baron Archer of Sandwell, 85, British politician, MP for Rowley Regis and Tipton (1966–1974) and Warley West (1974–1992).
Víctor Manuel Báez, Mexican crime journalist, murdered.
Bill Barlee, 79, Canadian politician.
Rosalie Bertell, 83, American scientist, author, environmental activist, epidemiologist, and nun, cancer.
Al Brancato, 93, American baseball player (Philadelphia Athletics).
Bob Chappuis, 89, American AAFC football player (Brooklyn Dodgers, Chicago Hornets), complications of a fall.
Anadi Sankar Gupta, 79, Indian mathematician.
Bob Hank, 88, Australian SANFL footballer (West Torrens), ruptured abdominal aortic aneurysm.
Margie Hyams, 91, American jazz musician, renal failure.
Karl-Heinz Kämmerling, 82, German classical pianist and teacher.
Hassan Kassai, 83, Iranian musician.
Adrien Poliquin, 83, Canadian Olympic wrestler.
Jesse Powell, 65, American football player (Miami Dolphins).
Kaka Radhakrishnan, 86, Indian actor, respiratory failure.
Carlos Reichenbach, 67, Brazilian filmmaker, cardiac arrest.
Erik Rhodes, 30, American pornographic actor, heart attack.
Jean Robieux, 86, French physicist.
Jaroslav Šabata, 84, Czech politologist and dissident.
Gitta Sereny, 91, Austrian-born British author.
Juha Sihvola, 54, Finnish historian and philosopher.
Mundia Sikatana, 74, Zambian politician and diplomat.
Mako Tabuni, Indonesian separatist leader, deputy chairman of the National Committee for West Papua, shooting.
Jerry Tubbs, 77, American football player (Dallas Cowboys, Chicago Cardinals, San Francisco 49ers).
Yvette Wilson, 48, American comedian and actress (Moesha, The Parkers), cervical cancer.

15
Anouar Abdel-Malek, 88, Egyptian-born French political scientist.
Araafa, 9, Irish-bred, British-trained Thoroughbred racehorse and sire, ruptured blood vessel.
Robin Benson, 83, Irish sailor.
 Francis Bonaert, 97, Belgian architect.
Don Cacas, 80, Australian Olympic wrestler.
 Phillip D. Cagan, 85, American economist.
 Günther Domenig, 77, Austrian architect.
 Rune Gustafsson, 78, Swedish jazz guitarist and composer.
 George Kerr, 74, Jamaican athlete, heart attack.
 Barry MacKay, 76, American tennis player and commentator.
* Albino Mamede Cleto, 77, Portuguese Roman Catholic prelate, Bishop of Coimbra (2001–2011).
 Israel Nogueda Otero, 77, Mexican politician and economist, Governor of Guerrero (1971–1975), heart attack.
Carl Julius Norstrøm, 76, Norwegian economist.
Alan Saunders, 58, English-born Australian broadcaster and philosopher, pneumonia.
Simon Tortell, 52, Maltese football player.
Pasa Tosusu, 54, Vanuatuan civil servant.
Albert Joseph Tsiahoana, 84, Malagasy Roman Catholic prelate, Archbishop of Antsiranana (1967–1998).
Arthur Henry Winnington Williams, 99, Jamaican parliamentarian.
Angus Wright, 78, British television producer.

16
Nayef bin Abdulaziz Al Saud, 78, Saudi royal, Governor of Riyadh (1953–1955), Minister of Interior (since 1975), and Crown Prince (since 2011).
Jaroslava Adamová, 87, Czech actress.
Giuseppe Bertolucci, 65, Italian film director.
Kamala Bose, 64, Indian classical vocalist.
Howie Chizek, 65, American public address announcer (Cleveland Cavaliers, Cleveland Force) and talk radio host (WNIR), heart attack.
June Curry, 91, American housewife.
Dan Dorfman, 80, American financial journalist (CNN, CNBC), cardiogenic shock.
John Faiman, 70, American football player, brain aneurysm.
Sir Alasdair Fraser, 65, Northern Irish lawyer, Director of Public Prosecutions for Northern Ireland (1989–2010), cancer.
Nils Karlsson, 94, Swedish Olympic gold medal-winning (1948) cross-country skier.
Jorge Lankenau, 68, Mexican banker.
Sławomir Petelicki, 65, Polish army officer (JW GROM), suspected suicide by gunshot.
 Stanley Pinker, 87, South African painter and printmaker.
Thierry Roland, 74, French sports journalist, stroke.
Jiří Siegel, 85, Czech Olympic basketball player.
Susan Tyrrell, 67, American actress (Cry-Baby, Fat City, The Chipmunk Adventure), essential thrombocytosis.

17
Stéphane Brosse, 40, French ski mountaineer, climbing accident.
Patricia Brown, 81, American baseball player (All-American Girls Professional Baseball League) and professor (Suffolk University).
George Casella, 61, American statistician, multiple myeloma.
Jack Caulfield, 83, American security operative and law enforcement officer.
* Chen Din Hwa, 89, Chinese industrialist, prostate cancer.
Nathan Divinsky, 87, Canadian mathematician, author, and chess master.
Kevin Easton, 79, Australian footballer.
Brian Hibbard, 65, Welsh actor and singer (The Flying Pickets), prostate cancer.
Anthony Ekezia Ilonu, 74, Nigerian Roman Catholic prelate, Bishop of Okigwe (1981–2006).
Raivo Järvi, 57, Estonian artist, radio personality, and politician, member of the Riigikogu (since 2003).
Rodney King, 47, American victim of videotaped police beating that sparked the 1992 Los Angeles riots, accidental drowning.
Walo Lüönd, 85, Swiss actor, pneumonia.
John McEldowney, 64,  New Zealand international rugby union player.
Don Owen, 82, American news anchor (KSLA).
R. C. Owens, 77, American football player (San Francisco 49ers, Baltimore Colts, New York Giants) and executive (San Francisco 49ers).
Bernard Prior, 78, English rugby league player.
Fauzia Wahab, 56, Pakistani politician, complications of gall bladder surgery.

18
Nicky Barnes, 78, American crime boss, cancer.
Doug Brown, 88, Australian footballer.
Don Charlwood, 96, Australian author.
Kay Christopher, 86, American actress and model, diabetes.
Horacio Coppola, 105, Argentine photographer and filmmaker.
Lina Haag, 105, German anti-fascist activist.
Dennis Hamilton, 68, American basketball player (Los Angeles Lakers), cancer.
Ghazala Javed, 24, Pakistani singer, shooting.
Eva Klepáčová, 79, Czech actress.
Tom Maynard, 23, Welsh cricketer, electrocution.
Luis Edgardo Mercado Jarrín, 92, Peruvian politician, Prime Minister (1973–1975).
Jim Packard, 70, American public radio announcer (Whad'Ya Know?), cardiopulmonary disease.
Alketas Panagoulias, 78, Greek football player and manager.
*Salem Ali Qatan, Yemeni general, explosion.
Alexander Robinson, 87, Australian cricketer.
Victor Spinetti, 82, Welsh comic actor (A Hard Day's Night, Help!, Magical Mystery Tour), prostate cancer.
William Van Regenmorter, 73, American politician, Michigan State Senator (1991–2003) and State Representative (1983–1991, 2003–2007), Parkinson's disease.
Bernard Vifian, 67, Swiss cyclist.
Judith Wallerstein, 90, American psychologist and anti-divorce activist.
Ralph Wenzel, 69, American football player (Pittsburgh Steelers, San Diego Chargers), complications from dementia.

19
Guma Aguiar, 35, Brazilian-born American energy industrialist and businessman, drawn (disappeared on that day).
Anthony Bate, 84, British actor (Tinker Tailor Soldier Spy).
Bryan Bayley, 79, New Zealand cricketer.
Yves Boël, 84, Belgian businessman.
Gerry Bron, 79, British record producer and manager (Uriah Heep, Motörhead).
Jim Drake, 83, American aeronautical engineer, inventor of the windsurfer, complications from lung disease.
Romuald Drobaczyński, 81, Polish film director.
K. R. Gangadharan, 76, Indian film producer.
Walter Haefner, 101, Irish businessman and Thoroughbred owner.
Gerhard Kallmann, 97, German-born American architect (Boston City Hall), co-founder of Kallmann McKinnell & Wood.
Luuk Kroon, 69, Dutch naval officer, Commander of the Royal Netherlands Navy (1995–1998), Chief of the Netherlands Defence Staff (1998–2004).
* Aloysio José Leal Penna, 79, Brazilian Roman Catholic prelate, Archbishop of Botucatu (2000–2008).
Richard Lynch, 72, American actor (Battlestar Galactica, Star Trek: The Next Generation), heart attack.
Sir Michael Palliser, 90, British diplomat, Head of the Diplomatic Service (1975–1982).
Ronald Roberts, 89, British Olympic swimmer.
Harold H. Seward, 81, American computer scientist.
Joan LaCour Scott, 91, American screenwriter (The Waltons, Lassie).
Emili Teixidor, 78, Spanish writer and journalist, cancer.
Norbert Tiemann, 87, American politician, Governor of Nebraska (1967–1971).
Kevin M. Tucker, 71, American police commissioner of the Philadelphia Police Department (1986–1988), brain tumor.

20
Judy Agnew, 91, American Second Lady (1969–1973), widow of former Vice President Spiro Agnew.
Roman Bazan, 73, Polish footballer.
Frieda Berryhill, 90, American anti–nuclear power activist. 
 William W. Cooper, 97, American management scientist.
Robert J. Kelleher, 99, American tennis player, official (International Tennis Hall Of Fame inductee) and senior judge of the District Court for the Central District of California.
Alistair Vane-Tempest-Stewart, 9th Marquess of Londonderry, 74, British nobleman.
*Alcides Mendoza Castro, 84, Peruvian Roman Catholic prelate, Archbishop of Cuzco (1983–2003).
LeRoy Neiman, 91, American artist.
*Heinrich IV, Prince Reuss of Köstritz, 92, German noble.
Andrew Sarris, 83, American film critic, complications from a fall.
Mike Westmacott, 87, British mountaineer, member of 1953 British Mount Everest Expedition.
Robert Zimmermann, 77, Swiss Olympic bobsledder.

21
J. Michael Adams, 64, American professor, President of Fairleigh Dickinson University (since 1999), acute myeloid leukemia.
Richard Adler, 90, American Tony Award-winning producer and composer (Damn Yankees, The Pajama Game).
William Stewart, Lord Allanbridge, 86, Scottish judge and politician.
Tejparkash Singh Brar, 74, Kenyan Olympic hockey player.
Ziad Durrani, 30, Pakistani politician, cardiac arrest.
Sylvia Ettenberg, 94, Jewish educator.
Abid Hussain, 85, Indian civil servant and diplomat, heart attack.
Sunil Janah, 94, Indian photographer.
Viggo Johannessen, 76, Norwegian civil servant.
* Joviano de Lima Júnior, 70, Brazilian Roman Catholic prelate, Archbishop of Ribeirão Preto (since 2006).
Sir Alexander MacAra, 80, British doctor and medical administrator.
Shōgyo Ōba, 96, Japanese lacquer artist (Maki-e), Living National Treasure.
Radha Vinod Raju, 62, Indian police chief, lung infection and multiple organ failure.
Gilbert Blaize Rego, 90, Indian Roman Catholic prelate, Bishop of Simla and Chandigarh (1971–1999).
Anna Schwartz, 96, American economist and author (A Monetary History of the United States).
Teddy Scott, 83, Scottish footballer (Aberdeen).
Ramaz Shengelia, 55, Georgian football player, heart attack.
Drew Turnbull, 82, British rugby player, complications of Alzheimer's disease.

22
Obaidullah Baig, 76, Pakistani writer and television personality, cancer.
María Teresa Castillo, 103, Venezuelan journalist and activist, founder of the Caracas Athenaeum.
Edward N. Costikyan, 87, American politician and author.
DS Ravindra Doss, 67, Indian journalist and union leader.
Mary Fedden, 96, British painter.
Fernie Flaman, 85, Canadian ice hockey player (Boston Bruins, Toronto Maple Leafs) and Hall of Fame member.
Juan Luis Galiardo, 72, Spanish actor (Antony and Cleopatra, Tango), lung cancer.
Sergio Goretti, 83, Italian Roman Catholic prelate, Bishop of Assisi-Nocera Umbra-Gualdo Tadino (1980–2005).
Edmund Kornfeld, 93, American organic chemist.
Jackie Neilson, 83, Scottish footballer (St Mirren).
Mirjam Polkunen, 86, Finnish writer.
Rolly Tasker, 86, Australian Olympic silver medal-winning (1956) sailor, cancer.
Hans Villius, 88, Swedish historian, television and radio personality, complications of diabetes.
Margaret Wright, 72, British politician, Principal Speaker of the Green Party (1999–2003), cancer.

23
Adorable Rubí, 68, Mexican wrestler, kidney infection.
Hamza Banoub, 28, Algerian football player, heart attack.
Marjorie Chibnall, 96, British medievalist.
Franz Crass, 84, German singer. (German)
Count Robin de la Lanne-Mirrlees, 87, British author, soldier, and officer of arms.
James Durbin, 88, British statistician and econometrician.
Brigitte Engerer, 59, French pianist, cancer.
Arne Wegner Haaland, 88, Norwegian engineer.
Ken Hargreaves, 73, British politician, MP for Hyndburn (1983–1992), cancer.
Hollywood Wildcat, 22, American Thoroughbred racehorse, winner of the Breeders' Cup Distaff (1993) and Gamely Stakes (1994), cancer.
Robert G. Marotz, 90, American politician, Wisconsin State Assemblyman (1949–1959) and Speaker (1957–1959).
Alan McDonald, 48, Northern Irish football player and manager, apparent heart attack.
Frank Chee Willeto, 87, American Navajo code talker in World War II, Congressional Silver Medal recipient, Vice President of the Navajo Nation (1998–1999).
Walter J. Zable, 97, American founder and CEO of Cubic Corporation.

24
Chris Adams, 84, English footballer.
Darrel Akerfelds, 50, American baseball player (Philadelphia Phillies) and coach (San Diego Padres), pancreatic cancer.
Gad Beck, 88, German educator, author, and gay Holocaust survivor.
Choi Chung-sik, 80, South Korean athlete.
Jean Cox, 90, American opera singer.
Youssef Dawoud, 74, Egyptian actor.
Ralph Elliott, 90, German-born Australian professor of English and runologist.
Elwi Gazi, 82–83, Egyptian Olympic equestrian.
Karnail Gill, 70, Indian folk singer, cancer.
James Grout, 84, English actor (Inspector Morse).
Ruth Grulkowski, 81, American Olympic gymnast.
* Gu Chaohao, 86, Chinese mathematician.
Karl Guðmundsson, 88, Icelandic football player and manager.
Birger Karlsson, 85, Finnish Olympic rower.
Heino Kruus, 85, Estonian Olympic silver medal-winning (1952) basketball player.
Lonesome George, 100+, Ecuadorian Pinta Island tortoise endling, apparent heart failure.
Ted Luckenbill, 72, American basketball player (Philadelphia Warriors), cancer.
Miki Roqué, 23, Spanish footballer, cancer.
Ann C. Scales, 60, American lawyer and law professor, complications of a fall.
Rudolf Schmid, 97, Swiss-born German Roman Catholic prelate, Auxiliary Bishop of Augsburg (1972–1990).
Claude Sumner, 92, Canadian philosopher.

25
Robert F. Berkhofer, 80, American historian.
Krishna Bhusan Bal, 64, Nepalese poet, intracerebral hemorrhage.
Shigemitsu Dandō, 98, Japanese jurist and Supreme Court judge.
Erhard Domay, 72, German theologian.
Norman Felton, 99, British-born American television producer (The Man from U.N.C.L.E.).
Yitzhak Galanti, 75, Israeli politician.
Campbell Gillies, 21, Scottish jockey, swimming pool accident.
George Randolph Hearst, Jr., 84, American businessman (Hearst Corporation), complications from a stroke.
Vyacheslav Ionov, 71, Russian Olympic gold medal-winning (1964) sprint canoer.
Lucella MacLean, 91, Canadian baseball player (All-American Girls Professional Baseball League).
Sir David Money-Coutts, 80, British banker.
Edgar Ross, 62, American boxer.
Doris Schade, 88, German television actress.
Kjell Sørensen, 81, Norwegian Olympics sports shooter.

26
Sverker Åström, 96, Swedish diplomat.
Daniel Batman, 31, Australian Olympic (2000) sprinter, traffic collision.
Miloš Blagojević, 81, Serbian historian.
Dan Carr, 60, American poet, cancer.
Chen Qiang, 94, Chinese actor.
Pat Cummings, 55, American basketball player (New York Knicks, Miami Heat).
Angelo Cuniberti, 91, Italian-born Colombian Roman Catholic prelate, Vicar Apostolic of Florencia (1961–1978).
Ann Curtis, 86, American Olympic gold and silver medal-winning (1948) swimmer.
Juan Carlos Dyrzka, 71, Argentine Olympic (1964, 1968) hurdler, heart failure.
Harry Edwards, 85, Australian politician, member of the Australian House of Representatives for Berowra (1972–1993).
Nora Ephron, 71, American screenwriter and film director (When Harry Met Sally..., Sleepless in Seattle, Bewitched), BAFTA winner (1990), pneumonia.
José García Ortíz, 63, Mexican politician, MP (2003–2006).
Malcolm Glazzard, 80, English footballer.
Amar Goswami, 66, Indian writer and journalist.
Harry W. Kvebæk, 87, Norwegian musician.
Harry Levinson, 90, American psychologist.
Howard Michell, 98, Australian businessman and philanthropist.
Mario O'Hara, 68, Filipino film director, leukemia.
Doris Singleton, 92, American actress (I Love Lucy, My Three Sons).

27
* Jerónimo Tomás Abreu Herrera, 81, Dominican Roman Catholic prelate, Bishop of Mao-Monte Cristi (1978–2006).
Dénes Berényi, 83, Hungarian physicist.
Filemón Camacho, 85, Venezuelan Olympic athlete.
Susanna Clark, 73, American artist and songwriter, cancer.
Stan Cox, 93, British Olympic athlete (1948, 1952).
Renate Damm, 65, German road bicycle racer.
Rosemary Dobson, 92, Australian poet.
Bobby Jack Floyd, 82, American football player.
Jesse Glover, 77, American martial arts instructor, cancer.
Don Grady, 68, American actor (My Three Sons, The Mickey Mouse Club), cancer.
Eddie Jones, 74, American football executive (Miami Dolphins).
Iurie Miterev, 37, Moldovan international footballer, leukemia.
Konstantinos Triaridis, 74, Greek politician, Minister for Macedonia-Thrace (1993–1996), cancer.
Algimantas Vincas Ulba, 73, Lithuanian politician.

28
Vicente Bobadilla, 74, Paraguayan footballer.
Stephen Dwoskin, 73, American experimental filmmaker.
Fred Dyke, 89, Canadian curler.
Éric Gaudibert, 75, Swiss composer.
Kamal Ghanaja, Jordanian Hamas member, shot.
Richard Isay, 77, American psychiatrist, cancer.
Ivan Karp, 86, American art dealer, natural causes.
Leontine T. Kelly, 92, American Methodist bishop.
Ron Lynch, 89, English cricketer, long illness.
Gabriel G. Nahas, 92, American physician.
Robert Sabatier, 88, French writer.
Chris Sanderson, 38, Canadian lacrosse player and coach, cancer.
Doris Sams, 85, American baseball player (All-American Girls Professional Baseball League).
Norman Sas, 87, American entrepreneur, inventor of Electric football, stroke.
Herb Scherer, 83, American basketball player (Tri-Cities Blackhawks, New York Knicks).
Paul Stassino, 82, Greek-Cypriot actor (Thunderball).
Zhang Ruifang, 94, Chinese film actress.

29
Vahe Avetyan, 32, Armenian doctor, brain injury.
Carlos Alberto Martins Cavalheiro, 80, Brazilian Olympic footballer.
Takeo Chii, 70, Japanese actor, heart failure.
Joan Dunlop, 78, British health advocate and activist, cancer.
Antonio Floirendo Sr., 96, Filipino entrepreneur and landowner, kidney failure.
Verna Harrah, 67, American film producer (Anaconda).
Graham Horn, 57, English footballer (Luton Town).
Mogale Paul Nkhumishe, 74, South African Roman Catholic prelate, Bishop of Witbank (1984–2000) and Polokwane (2000–2011).
Vincent Ostrom, 92, American political scientist.
Juan Reccius, 101, Chilean Olympic athlete (1936), South American champion (1935).
Włodzimierz Sokołowski, 71, Polish Olympic athlete.
Floyd Temple, 86, American baseball coach (University of Kansas).
* José Sótero Valero Ruz, 76, Venezuelan Roman Catholic prelate, Bishop of Guanare (2001–2011).
Yong Nyuk Lin, 94, Singaporean politician.

30
Michael Abney-Hastings, 14th Earl of Loudoun, 69, British Australian peer.
Luís Caldas, 85, Portuguese Olympic wrestler.
Vladlen Davydov, 88, Soviet and Russian theater and film actor.
Miguel S. Demapan, 59, American jurist, Chief Justice of the Northern Mariana Islands Supreme Court (1999–2011).
Richard Eardley, 83, American politician, Mayor of Boise, Idaho (1974–1986), heart attack.
Olivier Ferrand, 42, French civil servant and public intellectual.
Marilyn Houlberg, 72, American anthropologist.
Thymios Karakatsanis, 71, Greek actor.
Jacqueline Law, 45, Hong Kong actress, pancreatic cancer.
Joyce D. Miller, 84, American union activist.
Armando Montaño, 22, American student and journalist, suffocation.
Ivan Sekyra, 59, Czech guitarist (Abraxas).
Yitzhak Shamir, 96, Israeli politician, Prime Minister (1983–1984, 1986–1992), Alzheimer's disease.
Yomo Toro, 78, Puerto Rican cuatro player, kidney failure.
Michael J. Ybarra, 45, American journalist and author, climbing accident.

References

2012-06
 06